Alice Elliott is a director, a writer, producer, university teacher, advocate for people with disabilities, and a member of New Day Films, an educational film distribution cooperative.

Elliott was an actress for over twenty years, appearing in two feature films, over 100 commercials and had a 10-year recurring role on the ABC daytime drama, Loving. She has produced voiceovers for radio and television. Her writing includes work for the stage, television and film. She continues to do voiceover work, and teaches as an adjunct professor at the NYU School of Continuing and Professional Studies.

She established her company, Welcome Change Productions in 1991, and started producing the same year. Her first movie, Diamonds in the Rough, is an hour long documentary about a gifted, inner-city high school baseball team located in the largely Dominican Washington Heights neighborhood of New York City.

In 1997, Alice Elliott began work on her directorial debut, The Collector of Bedford Street, which she also produced. Since its completion, The Collector of Bedford Street has visited 27 festivals and has won 13 awards. It has been nominated for an Academy Award for Documentary Short Subject.

In 2007, Alice Elliott completed Body & Soul: Diana & Kathy, a rare look at a symbiotic relationship between two people some would call profoundly disabled. Body & Soul: Diana & Kathy was shortlisted for Academy Award consideration and played nationally on PBS.

She received a Guggenheim Fellowship in 2012.

Miracle on 42nd Street, a film about affordable housing for artists, was awarded a 2020 NY Emmy for Best Documentary.

References

External links
 Welcome Change Productions
 The Collector of Bedford Street Official Web Site
  Body & Soul: Diana & Kathy Official Web Site
 
  The Collector of Bedford Street at the Internet Movie Database
  New Day Films

Year of birth missing (living people)
Living people
American documentary filmmakers